Sunset Strip is a 2000 American comedy-drama film directed by Adam Collis for 20th Century Fox. The story was written by Randall Jahnson, who previously examined the rock scene in his scripts for The Doors and Dudes, and he and Russell DeGrazier adapted the story into a screenplay.

The film takes place in 1972, during one 24-hour period on Los Angeles's famed Sunset Strip, where the lives of a group of young people are about to change forever. Anna Friel stars as Tammy Franklin, a clothing designer, and Nick Stahl plays Zach, a novice guitarist; Jared Leto stars as Glen Walker, an up-and-coming country rocker. Simon Baker, Adam Goldberg, Rory Cochrane and Tommy Flanagan also feature. The film began shooting on November 9, 1998, and ended on January 11, 1999.

Plot
Sunset Strip tells the story of a number of music industry artists, all in the span of 24 hours on the Sunset Strip in Hollywood. Michael secretly pines for Tammy. She is busy sleeping with the up-and-coming country rocker Glen Walker and the rock star Duncan. Zach and his band are opening at the Whisky a Go Go for Duncan Reed and the Curb. In these 24 hours, they all cross paths pursue their dreams.

Cast
 Anna Friel as Tammy Franklin, a costume designer with a shop situated near the legendary Whisky a Go Go, who has sex with Walker and Reid
 Jared Leto as Glen Walker, a country rocker
 Tommy Flanagan as Duncan Reid, a rock star who is influenced by Jim Morrison and David Bowie
 Adam Goldberg as Marty Shapiro, a fast-talking record producer from the Valley
 Nick Stahl as Zach, a novice guitarist who believes that he is the successor of Jimi Hendrix
 Rory Cochrane as Felix, a troubled songwriter whose dream is to die of a drug and alcohol overdose
 Simon Baker as Michael Scott, a photographer who photographs Tammy Franklin and the musicians
 Darren E. Burrows as Bobby
 John Randolph as Mr. Niederhaus
 Stephanie Romanov as Christine
 Mary Lynn Rajskub as Eileen
 Maurice Chasse as Nigel
 Mike Rad as Badger
 Josh Richman as Barry Bernstein

Music
Stewart Copeland was approached by director Adam Collis to assemble the score for the film. Copeland recorded a slew of vintage songs. The music, some scored by Stewart Copeland, some written and selected by Robbie Robertson, is made in a bygone style that sometimes consciously mimics the multicharacter 1970s dramas.

Release and reception
On August 18, 2000, Sunset Strip opened to the public in limited release in a single theater in Los Angeles and New York City, and grossed $3,926 during the opening weekend. After two months, on October 12, 2000, the film was screened at the Austin Film Festival. Writing in Variety, Robert Koehler said "Interesting structure provides pic with plenty of opportunities for social satire, human comedy and chance encounters, but few setups are ever dramatically fulfilled." Kevin Thomas in Los Angeles Times said "Moves smoothly amid a near-perfect period evocation, captured in an array of shifting moods." Writing in Mr. Showbiz, Kevin Maynard praised the film, saying that it "has its funky charms." Cheryl DeWolfe of the Apollo Movie Guide said "This modestly successful drama follows a young ensemble cast through the ups and downs of the music business in all its stages of stardom."

Sunset Strip was released on VHS on February 13, 2001, and was re-released on September 4, 2001. On June 1, 2004, 20th Century Fox Home Entertainment released a DVD for region 1. The DVD release includes a wide-screen and a full-screen version of the film.

References

External links

 
 
 

2000 films
20th Century Fox films
2000s musical comedy-drama films
American musical comedy-drama films
American rock music films
Films about drugs
Films about alcoholism
Films directed by Adam Collis
Films produced by Art Linson
Films scored by Stewart Copeland
Films set in 1972
Films set in Los Angeles
2000 directorial debut films
2000 comedy films
2000 drama films
2000s English-language films
2000s American films